Buji station is a station on Line 3, Line 5 and Line 14 of the Shenzhen Metro. The Line 3 platforms opened on 28 December 2010, the Line 5 platforms opened on 22 June 2011 and the Line 14 platforms opened on 28 October 2022. Together with the co-located Shenzhen East railway station and two bus stations, it forms the Buji Transport Hub.

Station layout

Exits

Gallery

References

External links
 Shenzhen Metro Buji Station (Line 3) (Chinese)
 Shenzhen Metro Buji Station (Line 3) (English)
 Shenzhen Metro Buji Station (Line 5) (Chinese)
 Shenzhen Metro Buji Station (Line 5) (English)

Shenzhen Metro stations
Railway stations in Guangdong
Longgang District, Shenzhen
Railway stations in China opened in 2010